Meg Swansen is a knitting designer, owner of Schoolhouse Press and the daughter of Elizabeth Zimmermann.  Similar to her mother, she has helped to popularize knitting and is a well-respected author and knitting teacher, especially at her knitting retreats. Swansen also writes a long-running regular column in Vogue Knitting called "Meg Swansen on...", which covers everything from the Turkish cast on (Fall 2005), to lace knitting (Spring/Summer 2006), to the recherché Scandinavian two-end knitting (Winter 2006/2007).

Swansen runs a knitting camp in Marshfield, Wisconsin. This camp was established in 1974 by Elizabeth Zimmermann, and Meg took over the organization of the event when her mother retired.

Bibliography

Notes

References
 Fallick, M (1996). Knitting in America. Artisan Books.

External links
 Website for Schoolhouse Press

People in knitting
Living people
People from Marshfield, Wisconsin
Year of birth missing (living people)